Lirdaf (also Romanized as Līrdaf; also known as Līr and Līrd) is a village in Piveshk Rural District, Lirdaf District, Jask County, Hormozgan Province, Iran. At the 2006 census, its population was 662, in 130 families.

References 

Populated places in Jask County